The UAAP Season 80 seniors division football tournament started on February 3, 2018, with the women's tournament at the Rizal Memorial Stadium in Manila. While the juniors' division started on November 20, 2017 at the PFF National Training Centre inside the San Lazaro Leisure Park in Carmona, Cavite. National University Bullpups made their debut in the juniors' division.

In the finals of the juniors' division, FEU Diliman successfully defended their crown for a record of eight consecutive titles after defeating De La Salle Zobel on penalties, 4–2.

Venues

Men's tournament

Elimination round

Team standings

First round

Second round

Playoffs

Semifinals

Finals

Awards

Most Valuable Player: Ian Clarino (University of the Philippines)
Rookie of the Year: Fidel Tacardon (University of the Philippines)
Best Striker: Jarvey Gayoso (Ateneo De Manila University)
Best Midfielder: Darius Diamante (De La Salle University)
Best Defender: Ian Clarino (University of the Philippines)
Best Goalkeeper: Zaldy Abraham Jr. (University of Santo Tomas)
Fairplay Award: De La Salle University

Women's tournament

Elimination round

Team standings

First round

Second round

Finals

Awards

 Most Valuable Player: Kyla Jan Inquig (De La Salle University)
 Rookie of the Year: Anna Beatrice Delos Reyes (De La Salle University)
 Best Striker: Shelah Mae Cadag (University of Santo Tomas)
 Best Midfielder: Shannon Arthur (De La Salle University)
 Best Defender: Hanna Pachejo (Far Eastern University)
 Best Goalkeeper: Natasha Lacson (De La Salle University)
 Fair Play Award: University of Santo Tomas

Juniors' tournament

Elimination round

Team standings

Match-up results

Scores

Results to the right and top of the gray cells are first round games,those to the left and below are second round games.

Playoffs

Finals

Awards

 Most Valuable Player: Gio Pabualan (Far Eastern University)
 Rookie of the Year:
 Best Striker: Gio Pabualan (Far Eastern University)
 Best Midfielder: Shanden Vergara (De La Salle Zobel)
 Best Defender: French Talaroc (Far Eastern University)
 Best Goalkeeper: Jason Blanco (Far Eastern University)
 Fair Play Award: Ateneo de Manila University

Overall Championship points

Seniors' division

Juniors' division

See also
 UAAP Season 79

References 

79
2017 in Philippine football